Sir Alexander Malet, 2nd Baronet  (1800–1886) was an English diplomat and writer.

Life
The eldest son of Sir Charles Malet, 1st Baronet, born at Hartham Park, Wiltshire in June 1800, he succeeded to the baronetcy in 1815. He was educated at Winchester College and at Christ Church, Oxford (B.A. 1822), and entered the diplomatic service in 1824 as unpaid attaché at St. Petersburg. There he was an eye-witness to the Decembrist revolt of 1825.

Malet later became secretary of legation at Lisbon under Lord Howden during the Miguelite war of 1832–1834. He served in a similar post at The Hague, and was then secretary of the embassy at Vienna, and British minister at Württemberg.

In 1849 Malet became minister plenipotentiary to the Germanic Confederation at Frankfurt, and there formed a close friendship with Prince Bismarck. He was in post from the Revolution in Baden, to the battle of Sadowa, and the expulsion of Austria from the Confederation.

On the fall of the Germanic confederation in 1866, Malet retired on a pension, and was made a K.C.B. He died on 28 November 1886.

Works
Malet was the author of:

 Some Account of the System of Fagging at Winchester School, with Remarks … on the late Expulsions thence for resistance to the Authority of the Prefects, London, 1828;
 An English metrical translation of Wace's Roman de Rou, London, 1860; and of 
 The Overthrow of the Germanic Confederation by Prussia in 1866, London, 1870.

Family
In 1834 Malet married Marianne Dora, only daughter of John Spalding, of the Holm, Scotland and stepdaughter of Lord Brougham. They had two sons, Lieutenant-colonel Sir Henry Charles Eden Malet, 3rd Baronet, and Edward Malet.

Notes

Attribution

1800 births
1886 deaths
Deputy Lieutenants of Wiltshire
British diplomats
English writers
Baronets in the Baronetage of Great Britain
People from Wiltshire